Join the dots may refer to:

Join the Dots (The Nextmen album), 2009
Join the Dots (Toy album), 2013
Join The Dots, a shortened name of Join the Dots: B-Sides & Rarities 1978–2001 (The Fiction Years), a box set of The Cure released in 2004 
"Join The Dots," a song by Roots Manuva from his 2001 album Run Come Save Me
Connect the dots, a kind of paper puzzle